Mahamaya Rajkiya Allopathic Medical College or Mahamaya Government Allopathic Medical College, generally known as Mahamaya Medical College, is one of the state run medical colleges with multispeciality hospitals in Akbarpur, Ambedkar Nagar. The institution, as a mega project, is built within the constituency of chief minister of Uttar Pradesh Km. Mayawati with an expenditure of more than 400 crore. This institute has been established under the special component action plan.

The college has guidance and mentorship of Dr. Ram Manohar Lohia Institute of Medical Sciences, Lucknow.

Location

Mahamaya Allopathic Medical College is situated on SH5 between Tanda and Akbarpur.

Namesake

The institution is named after Queen Maha Maya, the mother of Gautama Buddha.

See also
Dr. Ram Manohar Lohia Avadh University
Dr. Ram Manohar Lohia Institute of Medical Sciences, Lucknow
Autonomous State Medical College Basti
Government Medical College, Kannauj
Government Medical College, Jalaun
Government Medical College, Azamgarh
Government Medical College, Banda
Autonomous State Medical College, Bahraich
Shaikh-Ul-Hind Maulana Mahmood Hasan Medical College

References

External links
 Official website

Medical colleges in Uttar Pradesh
Educational institutions established in 2010
2010 establishments in Uttar Pradesh
Colleges in Ambedkar Nagar district